The Grand Théâtre de Québec is a performing arts complex in Quebec City, Quebec, Canada. It was conceived to commemorate the Canadian Centennial of 1967 and the Quebec Conference, 1864, one of the key meetings leading to the Canadian Confederation of 1867.

Designed by Polish-Canadian architect Victor Prus, construction began in 1966 under Premier Jean Lesage but was stopped by the Union Nationale government of Daniel Johnson. Construction resumed in late 1967 but the theatre was not officially opened until January 16, 1971.

The theatre has two venues:
Salle Louis Fréchette, with 1,885 seats, is named after the 19th-century French-Canadian writer Louis-Honoré Fréchette.
Salle Octave Crémazie, with 510 seats, is named after the 19th-century Canadian poet, Octave Crémazie, who was known as "the father of French-Canadian poetry".

Since October 1972, the Conservatoire de musique du Québec à Québec has been located in the Grand Théâtre's complex. In 1991, the theatre complex housed 49 classrooms, 70 teaching and practice studios, and a multi-media centre with a recording studio and electroacoustic lab. The complex is also home to a library which in 1991 included more than 60,000 documents of books, scores, monographs, periodicals, and recordings in various media formats.

The theatre was used for the 1985 Shamrock Summit when Prime Minister Brian Mulroney entertained U.S. President Ronald Reagan.

In 2020, the Grand Théâtre de Québec was restored and covered with a glass envelope supported by a steel frame, designed by Lemay and Atelier 21, to preserve the structure's architecture and a sculptural mural from artist Jordi Bonet embedded into the façade. Protected from temperature and humidity fluctuations, the approach was considered a first in North America at the time of its implementation.

Organizations which use the theatre include the Orchestre symphonique de Québec, the Théâtre du Trident, and the Opéra de Québec. The Quebec City Summer Festival often hosts events in the theatre.

References

External links

Performing arts centres in Canada
Buildings and structures in Quebec City
Culture of Quebec City
Modernist architecture in Canada
Theatres in Quebec
Tourist attractions in Quebec City
Recording studios in Canada
Music venues in Quebec
Theatres completed in 1971
Opera houses in Quebec
1971 establishments in Quebec